Nesciothemis farinosa (Eastern Blacktail) is a species of dragonfly in the family Libellulidae.

Common Names
Common names for this species include Eastern Blacktail, Black-tailed Skimmer (not to be confused with the European and Asian species of the same name, Orthetrum cancellatum), Black-tailed Dancer, Black-tailed False-skimmer and Common Blacktail.

Distribution and status
It is found in Angola, Botswana, the Democratic Republic of the Congo, Ivory Coast, Egypt, Ethiopia, Guinea, Kenya, Liberia, Malawi, Mali, Mozambique, Namibia, Nigeria, Sierra Leone, Somalia, South Africa, Sudan, Tanzania, Uganda, Zambia, Zimbabwe, and possibly Burundi.

Habitat
Its natural habitats are subtropical or tropical moist lowland forests, dry savanna, moist savanna, subtropical or tropical dry shrubland, subtropical or tropical moist shrubland, rivers, intermittent rivers, swamps, freshwater lakes, intermittent freshwater lakes, freshwater marshes, and intermittent freshwater marshes.

Gallery

References

 Clausnitzer, V. (2005). "Nesciothemis farinosa". IUCN Red List of Threatened Species. Version 2015.1. International Union for Conservation of Nature. Retrieved 10 August 2007.
 Tarboton, W.R.; Tarboton, M. (2015). A guide to dragonflies and damselflies of South Africa. 
 Dijkstra, K-D. B. & Clausnitzer, V. 2015 The dragonflies and damselflies of Eastern Africa. 

Libellulidae
Taxonomy articles created by Polbot
Insects described in 1898